Bharat Ratna Shri Atal Bihari Vajpayee Ekana Cricket Stadium, generally known as Ekana Cricket Stadium, is an international cricket stadium in Lucknow, Uttar Pradesh state in India. This arena have seating capacity of 50,000, thus it is the fifth largest international cricket stadium in nation. Formerly known as the Ekana International Cricket Stadium, it was renamed in honour of former Prime minister of India, Atal Bihari Vajpayee.

The stadium has the longest straight boundaries in comparison to all the stadiums in India. This arena is the home ground of Uttar Pradesh cricket team and set to be the home venue of IPL franchise Lucknow Super Giants from 2023 season.

In 2019 Afghanistan cricket team used it as their home ground.

History 

The Stadium is built under public-private partnership between Ekana Sportz City and Lucknow Development Authority. Ekana Sportz City is a Joint venture between Nagarjuna Construction Company, GC Construction & Development Industries Pvt Ltd. As per the agreement of the partnership, the government provided Ekana Sportz City with 35 year lease of 71 acres to build the cricket stadium, with the lease running through 2052. In addition, the government also provided 66 additional acres of land for real estate projects on a 99 year lease. The cricket stadium has been built with a budget of 360 crores (3.6 billion rupees).

Before its international debut, it also hosted the final of the 2017–18 Duleep Trophy. The stadium was allocated the 3rd ODI between India and New Zealand to be held on 27 Oct 2017. However, the venue was shifted to Kanpur after the stadium was declared incomplete. On 6 November 2018, the stadium hosted its first international match, a Twenty20 International (T20I) between India and the West Indies, becoming the 52nd stadium in India to host an international cricket match. International cricket match returned to Lucknow after 24 years, after the India and Sri Lanka test match of 1994. In that match Rohit Sharma became the first cricketer to score four centuries in T20Is. India won that match by 71 runs. The last time Lucknow hosted an international match was in January 1994, when India played a test match against Sri Lanka at the K.D. Singh Babu Stadium.

In May 2019, Afghanistan Cricket Board requested the BCCI to use this venue for their international matches. In August 2019, BCCI awarded the venue to Afghanistan national cricket team as their third home venue in India, being previously played in Dehradun and Greater Noida.

It hosted all the matches during Afghanistan vs West Indies series in 2019. On 6 November 2019, the venue hosted its first ODI match. On 27 November 2019, the venue hosted its first Test match.

In May 2022, the venue was scheduled to host all the matches of the fourth edition of Women's T20 Challenge. However, later the matches were shifted to Maharashtra Cricket Association Stadium in Pune.

The stadium has been considered to host the home matches of the IPL franchise Lucknow Super Giants from 2023 season. BCCI announced that the old home and away format is going to be back in the league from 2023 as it was before the COVID-19 pandemic in 2019 season.

Controversies 
Indian captain Hardik Pandya criticized this arena's pitch after national team played a low scoring T20 game against touring New Zealand team. Many noticed that the pitch favoured spin bowling which is unusual for a T20 game. The pitch favoured so much to the spinners that Kiwi captain Mitchell Santner asked his main fast bowlers whether they can spin the ball, Later UP association fired the pitch curator who made the pitch. But as per many Indian team management told the curator to alter pitch and he didn't get enough time to prepare a quality pitch.

Events hosted 
The stadium has hosted two major events organized by the government.

Award giving ceremony 
On 19 August 2021, an award giving ceremony was held at the stadium by the state government to honor the athletes who won the medals at 2020 Summer Olympics that was held in 2021 at Tokyo, Japan. They all were facilitated with monetary rewards given by the Uttar Pradesh government. The highest prize was given to the Niraj Chopra who was the only one from India to won gold medal in Javelin throw.

Oath-taking ceremony 
On 25 March 2022, the venue hosted the oath taking ceremony of Chief Minister, Shri Yogi Adityanath and his ministers of the consecutive second ministry after the historic win in 2022 Uttar Pradesh Legislative Assembly elections. The oath was given by the Governor Anandiben Patel. Many VVIP's, celebrities, big businessmen were invited in the ceremony including the Prime Minister, Shri Narendra Modi, Union Home Minister, Shri Amit Shah and the Chief Ministers of various big and NDA led Indian states.

International Records at the venue

List of international centuries

Test ma 
Only one Test century has been scored at the venue.

One Day Internationals 
Two ODI centuries have been scored at the venue, one in a men's match and one in a women's match.

Twenty20 Internationals 
Only one T20I century has been scored at the venue.

List of international five-wicket hauls

Test matches

T20Is

Gallery

See also

 Lucknow Super Giants
 Indian Premier League
 K.D Singh Babu Cricket Stadium
 Green Park Stadium
 Saifai International Cricket Stadium
 List of Test cricket grounds 
 Atal Bihari Vajpayee Stadium, Himachal Pradesh

References

2017 establishments in Uttar Pradesh
Sports venues in Lucknow
Memorials to Atal Bihari Vajpayee
Sports venues completed in 2017
Test cricket grounds in India

External links